Carlist Party may refer to:
 Carlist Party (formed 1833)
 Carlist Party (founded 1970)